In February 2013, Big Finish Productions announced that, following the conclusions of the Lost Stories and the monthly Companion Chronicles, they would be launching The Early Adventures, a series of brand new stories featuring the First and Second Doctors. The four-part plays star surviving lead actors from the original series, and follow a similar structure to the Lost Stories set in this era, mixing dialogue and narration.

Cast

Episodes

Series 1 (2014)
The first series consist of stories featuring the First Doctor. William Russell reprises the role of Ian Chesterton in the first two stories, while Peter Purves reprises the role of Steven Taylor in the second two. Carole Ann Ford plays Susan Foreman in the first story, Maureen O'Brien plays Vicki in the second and third stories, and Jean Marsh plays Sara Kingdom in the fourth.  Additionally, Russell and Purves perform the Doctor's dialogue in their respective stories, while Ford and O'Brien perform the dialogue of Barbara Wright in the first two stories. The stories have individual episode titles to replicate the era.

Series 2 (2015–16)
The second series consists of stories featuring the Second Doctor, played in all four stories by Frazer Hines, who also reprises his original role from the series as the Doctor's companion Jamie McCrimmon. Anneke Wills reprises her role as Polly Wright in the first two stories, Deborah Watling reprises the role of Victoria Waterfield in the third story, and Wendy Padbury reprises the role of Zoe Heriot in the fourth.  In addition, the first two stories feature Elliot Chapman as Ben Jackson, originally played by Michael Craze.

Series 3 (2016)
The third series of the Early Adventures saw Carole Ann Ford, William Russell, Maureen O'Brien, Peter Purves and Jean Marsh reprising their roles as the companions of the First Doctor,  joined by Jemma Powell as Barbara Wright, who had previously portrayed the role of original Barbara actress Jacqueline Hill in the 2013 drama An Adventure in Space and Time, and Dan Starkey as the Sontarans.  The second story also features actor James Joyce in the role of a new companion, Jospa. The stories have individual episode titles to replicate the era.

Series 4 (2017)
Frazer Hines, Anneke Wills, Elliot Chapman and Wendy Padbury reprise their roles as the Doctor's companions, with Frazer Hines also playing the Second Doctor. Other characters are also played by Anjella Mackintosh, Wanda Opalinska, Kristina Buikaite, Alistair Petrie, Debbie Chazen, Matilda Ziegler, David Sibley, Kerry Gooderson, Ewan Bailey, Alan Blyton, Judith Roddy, Adam Newington, Don McCorkindale, Richenda Carey.

Series 5 (2018)
Series 5 was written and marketed as a "season" of episodes, where each story directly follows from the one before it. Peter Purves returned as Steven Taylor and provided the voice of the First Doctor. Maureen O'Brien returned as Vicki. This season featured the first appearance of the Daleks in the Early Adventures range. The stories have individual episode titles to replicate the era.

Series 6 (2019)
Series 6 was created as part of Big Finish's celebration of their 20th anniversary of publishing Doctor Who audio dramas. The series features a number of firsts for the range, including the first story to feature multiple Doctors and the first story to feature the Master. In a first for any performed Doctor Who media, this series also features the return of companion Katarina and the first performed story featuring the Second Doctor meeting the Master.

Series 7 (2021)

References

Audio plays based on Doctor Who
Big Finish Productions
Doctor Who spin-offs